"Stop and Stare" is the second single by American band OneRepublic from their debut studio album, Dreaming Out Loud (2007). "Stop and Stare" was released to American radio on November 27, 2007, and British radio on December 16, 2007, reaching number-one and to Australian radio on December 17, 2007, reaching number one as well following up on the global success of the previous top ten single "Apologize". The single was released on March 3, 2008, in the United Kingdom. "Stop and Stare" has sold over two million digital downloads worldwide.

The song starts off with an acoustic guitar riff accompanied  by a ringing electric guitar background fill. Both continue throughout the entire song. The song gradually builds up, with bass and drums coming in, as the song approaches the prechorus, before erupting into an emotional chorus led by Ryan Tedder's vocals and carried along by the full band. The song climaxes at the bridge, with Tedder's falsetto and an electric guitar tremolo background. In live versions, guitarist Drew Brown plays a tremolo guitar solo during the bridge portion instead of the original recording.

Critical reception
Nick Levine of Digital Spy described the song as "a big, muscular rock ballad, very much in the Matchbox 20 mould, steered by a vein-poppingly emotional vocal from lead singer Ryan Tedder".

Music video

The official music video for "Stop and Stare" premiered on MTV's TRL on January 28, 2008. The video was directed by Anthony Mandler.

The video was filmed in the desert of Palmdale, California at an old gas station/motel. Throughout the video we see flashes of scenes with multiple versions of the band members Ryan Tedder, Zach Filkins, Eddie Fisher, Brent Kutzle, and Drew Brown. As the video begins, we see Ryan walking through the desert toward an open grave where a preacher stands delivering a eulogy. As he walks, we see flashes of scenes with Ryan completely submerged in a bathtub while fully clothed, in motel room #7 staring at a television displaying static, ringing the service bell at the motel desk, and sitting and waiting in the motel lobby. More Ryans are seen wandering around the motel, and again in motel room #7 leaning against the wall listening, while yet another Ryan is seen frantically driving a car with a pregnant woman in the back seat about to give birth. The Ryan standing at the open grave splits into two Ryans with one Ryan staying by the grave appearing to pray, while the second Ryan walks back toward the motel.

At one point, we see the band in motel room #13 performing the song and Ryan entering the room and joining them. Outside the motel, people from all walks of life have been gathering. Among them are Ryan, Zach, Eddie, Brent and Drew. They are all just standing outside the motel, staring. Many of these scenes repeat and continue to flash back and forth, culminating in a scene where the Ryan driving the car comes to a screeching halt almost hitting the Ryan walking back from the grave as he crosses the road and the gathering of staring people look on unmoved. The static TV then bursts into flames, the Ryan in the bathtub emerges from the water, the preacher is alone at the open grave (with Ryan not there, concluding that the Ryan standing at the grave was the one who died) and the video ends.

Chart performance
"Stop and Stare" became the band's second top twenty hit in the US, reaching number twelve on the Hot 100 and number nine on the Pop 100, but climbing as high as number two on the US adult airplay chart. Its video also reached number one on the VH1 Top 20 Video Countdown. The song has reached the top twenty in Australia and New Zealand, peaking at number eleven in both countries on the singles chart, and reaching number one on the airplay chart. It has reached the top twenty in most of Europe. In the United Kingdom, the song debuted at number eleven on the singles chart and the following week, it reached number nine on the UK Singles Chart, still on downloads alone. Upon physical release, "Stop and Stare" has peaked at number four on the chart, earning OneRepublic their second top five hit in Britain. In Ireland, the song debuted at number eight due to high downloads and reached number two on the airplay chart. In Germany, the song was rewarded the highest debut upon entering the chart at number seven in its first week, peaking at number six. The song has held steady at number four on the Billboard European Hot 100.

Track listing

UK CD single
"Stop and Stare" — 3:44
"Hearing Voices" — 4:01

German and Australian CD single
"Stop and Stare" — 3:43
"Something's Not Right Here" — 3:02

German enhanced CD single
"Stop and Stare" — 3:43
"Something's Not Right Here" — 3:02
"Hearing Voices" — 4:01
"Stop and Stare" (video)

Digital download (Hit 3 Pack)
"Stop and Stare" — 3:43
"Last Goodbye" (Stripped Live Mix) — 4:31
"Too Easy" — 3:14

Charts

Weekly charts

Year-end charts

Certifications

Release history

References

External links 
 Official website
 Dreaming Out Loud UK website
 

OneRepublic songs
2008 singles
Music videos directed by Anthony Mandler
Rock ballads
Pop ballads
Interscope Records singles
Song recordings produced by Greg Wells
Songs written by Ryan Tedder
Songs written by Zach Filkins
2007 songs
Mosley Music Group singles
Songs written by Eddie Fisher (drummer)
Songs written by Tim Myers
2000s ballads